"Swastika Eyes" (stylised as "SWSTK YS" and also known as "War Pigs") is a song by Scottish rock band Primal Scream, released on 8 November 1999 as the lead single from their sixth studio album XTRMNTR (2000). The attention-grabbing title is an example of the band's confrontational style in this period, although they have stated that the song is an attack on corporations and governments. The song peaked at number 22 on the UK Singles Chart.

The "Swastika Eyes" single has two mixes of the song by the Chemical Brothers and Jagz Kooner respectively. Both mixes were included on the album XTRMNTR. The Spectre Mix by Kooner was listed as Jagz Kooner mix on the album.

Reception
Reviewing a live show from the XTRMNTR tour, Guardian critic Dave Simpson compared the song to the work of D.A.F.

Track listings

Charts

References

External links
 Music video (band YouTube page)

1999 singles
1999 songs
Astralwerks singles
Creation Records singles
Primal Scream songs
Songs written by Andrew Innes
Songs written by Bobby Gillespie